Emyr Llywelyn Jones is a Welsh political activist, who was active during the 1960s and 1970s.  Mudiad Adfer was established based on his philosophies, and those of Owain Owain and Professor J. R. Jones. Commonly known as Emyr Llywelyn, he is also known as Emyr Llew. He is the son of author and poet T. Llew Jones.

Llywelyn was educated at Ysgol Gynradd Coed-y-bryn, Llandysul Grammar School, and the University of Wales, Aberystwyth.

He is one of the founders and a contributor to the Welsh monthly publication, Y Faner Newydd.

Llywelyn was imprisoned in 1963 for causing damage to the building site of the dam at Tryweryn; he was sentenced to 12 months imprisonment.

In 2000 Llywelyn, who at that time was a member of Cylch Yr Iaith, was imprisoned again, this time for a week for not paying his TV licence.

He worked as a Welsh teacher for several decades, at schools in Port Talbot, Llanon and Aberaeron, and now resides in Ffostrasol, Ceredigion.

Bibliography
Llwybrau Llên, October 2005 (Y Lolfa)
Cyfres Ti'n Jocan: Hiwmor y Cardi, March 2006 (Y Lolfa)
Themâu ein Llên: Blas ar Themâu ein Llenorion, January 2007 (Y Lolfa)

References

Living people
Year of birth missing (living people)
Welsh nationalists
Welsh activists
Welsh writers
People educated at Llandysul Grammar School